This is a chronological list of short fiction by American writer Ray Bradbury. Only original works are listed, along with their first publication. Several stories exist in one or more revised versions, sometimes under different titles.

1930s

1938

1939

1940s

1940

1941

1942

1943

1944

1945

1946

1947

1948

1949

1950s

1950

1951

1952

1953

1954

1955

1956

1957

1958

1959

1960s

1960

1962

1964
Heavy Set

1965

References

The primary source of information for this list is: 
Eller, Jonathan R., and William F. Touponce. Ray Bradbury: The Life of Fiction. Kent State University Press, 2004.

Additionally, the Internet Speculative Fiction Database (ISFDB) has provided valuable information: 
http://www.isfdb.org/cgi-bin/index.cgi

A comprehensive overview of Ray Bradbury's written works by

External links
 
 
 
 

Bibliographies by writer